The Corner is a 2014 Iranian drama film directed by Abed Abest. It was screened in Cairo International Film Festival.

Cast
 Abed Abest

References

External links
 

2014 films
2014 drama films
2010s Persian-language films
Iranian drama films